Sam J. Nock (born 18 June 1996) is a New Zealand rugby union player who currently plays as a halfback for  in the Bunnings NPC and the  in the Super Rugby competition.

Early career
Attending Saint Kentigern College in Auckland, Nock's talent was clear from an early age as he played for their top side for 3 years and captained them to national and world schools championship titles in his senior year.

Senior career
In his first year out of school, Nock returned home to play for the Northland Taniwha. He played all 10 games for them during what proved to be a torrid 2015 campaign which saw them finish bottom of the Championship standings with no wins to show for their efforts. He continued to be first choice number 9 for the Taniwha in 2016, but injury ended his season early after he had started the first 7 games of the year.

Super Rugby
Because of Nock's promise as a school boy at Saint Kentigern College the Blues Super Rugby franchise announced in June 2015 that they'd signed him on a 3 year contract before he'd even played any national provincial championship rugby. He gained a season's experience at provincial level before joining up with the Blues ahead of the 2016 Super Rugby season. He spent the season as third choice halfback behind Bryn Hall and Billy Guyton.

International

Nock represented New Zealand Schoolboys in 2014 and then was a member of the New Zealand Under 20 side which finished 5th in the 2016 World Rugby Under 20 Championship which was held in England. After first playing for the Māori All Blacks in 2018 Nock was again named in the side in 2021.

References

1996 births
Living people
Blues (Super Rugby) players
Māori All Blacks players
New Zealand rugby union players
Northland rugby union players
People educated at Saint Kentigern College
Rugby union players from Whangārei
Rugby union scrum-halves